L. terrestris may refer to:
 Lumbricus terrestris, a worm species
 Lycosa terrestris, a spider species in the genus Lycosa
 Lysimachia terrestris, a plant species

See also
 Terrestris